Estadio La Cartuja, formerly Estadio Olímpico de Sevilla, officially known as Estadio La Cartuja de Sevilla, is a multi-purpose stadium situated in the Isla de la Cartuja in Seville, Spain. It is used mostly for football and it is commonly referred to as simply 'La Cartuja'. It was completed in 1999 for the World Championships in Athletics. With a capacity of 57,619 seats, La Cartuja is the 5th-largest stadium in Spain and the 2nd-largest in Andalusia. It was the venue for the 2003 UEFA Cup Final between Celtic and Porto.

History
The stadium was one of those included in the Seville bids for the 2004 and 2008 Summer Olympics. After the failure of the last bid, the stadium remained unused by either of Seville's major football teams as both Real Betis and Sevilla use their own stadia. However, both teams have expressed their intention to move temporarily while their respective home grounds are renovated.

The stadium is currently managed by the Sociedad Estadio Olímpico de Sevilla S.A., participated by the Regional Government of Andalusia (40% ownership), the Spanish Government (25%); Seville City Council (19%), Seville Congress of Deputies (13%) and the remaining 3% shared evenly between Seville's two football clubs: Real Betis and Sevilla FC.

The Spain national football team occasionally use the stadium for home games, last playing there in 2021. The stadium has previously hosted the final of the Copa del Rey. Real Betis's home game against Villarreal on 31 March 2007 also took place here following a temporary ban from the Manuel Ruiz de Lopera.

The Royal Spanish Tennis Federation has chosen it twice to host the Davis Cup final, in 2004 and 2011. On both occasions a temporary roof was installed on one side of the stadium, where the clay court was placed.

On 5 February 2020, the stadium was chosen by the Royal Spanish Football Federation to host four Copa del Rey finals from 2020 to 2023. 

On 23 April 2021 it was announced that the stadium will serve as a replacement host stadium for UEFA Euro 2020. It replaced San Mames Stadium in Bilbao as a host stadium, which was unable to fulfill its original hosting duties due to the COVID-19 pandemic. During the tournament, and as part of the UEFA Festival, Seville was illuminated at night with a light show across the cityscape.

International matches

Notable music events
On 9 October 1999, Mexican singer Luis Miguel performed a concert at the Stadium in front of 35,000 spectators during his Amarte Es Un Placer Tour.

On 16 September 2008, American entertainer Madonna played a concert in front of 47,712 spectators during her Sticky & Sweet Tour.

U2 performed at the stadium on 30 September 2010 during their U2 360° Tour, in front of a sold-out crowd of 76,159 people.

Depeche Mode were scheduled to perform at the stadium on 12 July 2009 as part of their Tour of the Universe, but the concert was cancelled due to singer Dave Gahan's leg injury.

Bruce Springsteen performed at the stadium on 13 May 2012 as part of his Wrecking Ball World Tour.

AC/DC performed here on 10 May 2016 as part of their Rock or Bust World Tour in front of 60,000 people.

Red Hot Chili Peppers opened their 2022 Global Stadium Tour at the stadium on 4 June 2022.

See also
 List of tennis stadiums by capacity

References

External links

 Official website
 Spanish football stadiums
 Photos of the Estadio Olimpico Football Temples of the World
 Estadios de Espana

Football venues in Seville
Athletics (track and field) venues in Spain
Multi-purpose stadiums in Spain
Estadio de La Cartuja
Sports venues in Andalusia
Sports venues completed in 1999
Rugby union stadiums in Spain
1999 establishments in Spain
UEFA Euro 2020 stadiums